Hedonism is the third album by Bellowhead, released on 4 October 2010. It was recorded in Abbey Road Studios and was produced by John Leckie. The band also developed a new ale named after the album. Some of the band members took part in the brewing process.

The album sold 60,000 copies, becoming the best-selling independent folk LP of all time.

Track listing

Bonus track (iTunes exclusive)

Personnel 
Jon Boden - lead vocals, fiddle, saw
Benji Kirkpatrick - guitar, bouzouki, mandolin
John Spiers - melodeon, Anglo-concertina
Andy Mellon - trumpet
Justin Thurgur - trombone
Brendan Kelly - saxophone, bass clarinet
Ed Neuhauser - Helicon, Tuba
Pete Flood - percussion
Rachael McShane - cello, fiddle, backing vocals
Paul Sartin - fiddle, oboe
Sam Sweeney - fiddle, pipes

References

Bellowhead albums
2010 albums